The 2010 Jacksonville Dolphins football team represented Jacksonville University in the 2010 NCAA Division I FCS football season. The Dolphins were led by fourth-year head coach Kerwin Bell and played their home games at D. B. Milne Field. They were a member of the Pioneer Football League. They finished the season 10–1, 8–0 in PFL play to finish tied for first place. They won their second PFL Championship in school history.

Schedule

References

Jacksonville
Jacksonville Dolphins football seasons
Pioneer Football League champion seasons
Jacksonville Dolphins football